Ellerman is a surname. Notable people with the surname include:

David Ellerman (born 1943), philosopher working in economics, political economy, social theory, philosophy and mathematics
Derek Ellerman (born 1978), the co-founder and board chair of Polaris Project, a Washington DC-based organization
Ferdinand Ellerman (1869–1940), American astronomer and photographer
John Ellerman, CH (1862–1933), English shipowner and investor
Sir John Ellerman, 2nd Baronet (1910–1973), English shipowner, natural historian and philanthropist
Juul Ellerman (born 1965), Dutch former international footballer

See also
Ellermann, surname
Ellerman (crater), lunar crater on the far side of the Moon
Ellerman bombs, micro solar flares named after Ferdinand Ellerman
Ellerman Lines, cargo and passenger shipping company that operated from the late 19th century into the 20th century